The Winnibigoshish Lake Dam is a dam at the outlet of Lake Winnibigoshish into the Mississippi River in Minnesota, United States. The dam crosses the county line between Cass County and Itasca County, and lies within the Leech Lake Indian Reservation. The first dam on the site was built by the United States Army Corps of Engineers from 1881 to 1884 to regulate the flow of water on the Upper Mississippi River. A constant flow was desired by loggers, fur traders, and millers downstream at St. Anthony Falls. The current structure was built in 1899.

Damage caused by the dam
At the time of the construction of the original dam, the region was inhabited almost exclusively by Ojibwa Indians, who had lived on the shores of this part of the river for many generations, as documented by the explorer, Henry Schoolcraft. The U.S. Army Corps of Engineers used 2,000,000 board-feet (4720 cubic meters) of pine for the dam and related buildings, wiping out large sections of conifer forests. Along the shores were the Ojibwa's hay fields, maple trees, gardens, cranberry marshes, wild rice marshes, villages, and burial mounds. A staple in their diet was fish, which they caught with nets placed in the swift and shallow river current. Recent archeological research has shown that the burial mounds and ceramic fragments dated from 700–1000 ce. The construction of this dam was a significant milestone in the historical record of white, Western European settlers, Christian missionaries, and commercial interests eradicating the indigenous population from most of Minnesota.

Replacement dam
The 1899 dam, which is in the National Register of Historic Places, replaced the 1884 dam, substituting concrete for wooden components. By the 1920s, Minnesotans were flocking to the area in search of pristine camping, fishing, and hunting grounds. The Northlands Camp built a hotel, cabins, and a store for the throngs of tourists. Today, scores of locks and dams effectively control the water level on the Upper Mississippi River, aiding navigation and averting most adverse flooding, and the tourism continues to be a significant contributor to the region's economy.

See also
List of dams and reservoirs in Minnesota

References

External links

Lake Winnibigoshish Dam - U.S. Army Corps of Engineers, St. Paul District
Historic American Engineering Record (HAER) documentation:
 about six dams including this one

Buildings and structures in Cass County, Minnesota
Buildings and structures in Itasca County, Minnesota
Dams completed in 1884
Dams completed in 1899
Dams on the Mississippi River
Dams on the National Register of Historic Places in Minnesota
Historic American Engineering Record in Minnesota
National Register of Historic Places in Cass County, Minnesota
United States Army Corps of Engineers dams
National Register of Historic Places in Itasca County, Minnesota